Junwoo (lit. "Comrades") is a South Korean television series about the Korean War that was broadcast on KBS from 1975 to 1978. Its first remake aired from 1983 to 1984. Its second remake, Legend of the Patriots, aired in 2010.

Cast 
 Ra Si-chan
 Jang Hang-sun
 Heo Young
 Kim Sang-hoon
 Park Hae-sang
 Yoon Deok-yong
 Cheon Jung-woo
 Seo Sang-ik
 Lee Hyun-doo
 Ahn Kwang-jin
 Song Jae-ho
 Maeng Ho-rim

1983 remake

Cast 
 Kang Min-ho
 Kim Si-won
 Jang Chil-gun
 Lee Mun-hwan
 Kim Yoon-hyeong
 Park Hae-sang
 Kim Cheon-man

Director 
 Jung Young-cheol

2010 remake

Ratings 

In this table,  represent the lowest ratings and  represent the highest ratings.

References

Korean Broadcasting System television dramas
1970s South Korean television series
Korean-language television shows
Korean War television series
South Korean historical television series